The following list includes notable people who were born, lived or  resided in Budapest, Hungary and/or  who   became its honorary citizens,   either during their lifetime or posthumously.


Nobel laureates, recipients of Wolf and Abel Prizes and other  celebrated honorary citizens 

 Georg von Békésy – Nobel Prize in Medicine (1961), University of Budapest
 Raoul Bott – Wolf Prize in Mathematics (2000), Harvard University
 Paul Erdős – Wolf Prize in Mathematics (1984), University of Budapest
 Dennis Gabor – Nobel Prize in Physics (1971), Budapest University of Technology and Economics
 John Harsanyi – Nobel Prize in Economics (1994), University of Budapest
 Václav Havel- (Hon. citizen) 
 George de Hevesy – Nobel Prize in Chemistry (1943), University of Budapest
 Imre Kertész – Nobel Prize in Literature (2002), Goethe Prize (2004)
 Peter Lax – Abel Prize (2005), Wolf Prize in Mathematics (1987), Stanford University
 Philipp Lenard – Nobel Prize in Physics (1905), University of Budapest
 László Lovász – Wolf Prize in Mathematics (1999), Fulkerson Prize (1982, 2012), University of Budapest, Yale University
 George Andrew Olah – Nobel Prize in Chemistry (1994), Budapest University of Technology and Economics
 John Charles Polanyi – Nobel Prize in Chemistry (1986), Wolf Prize (1982), Princeton University
 Elvis Presley – (Hon. citizen)
 Kati Kovács – (Hon. citizen)
 Ernő Rubik – (Hon. citizen)
 Gabor A. Somorjai – Wolf Prize in Chemistry (1998), Budapest University of Technology and Economics
 Endre Szemerédi – Abel Prize (2012), University of Budapest
 Albert Szent-Györgyi – Nobel Prize in Medicine (1937), Semmelweis University
 Edward Teller – (Hon. citizen)
 Lech Walesa – (Hon. citizen)
 Raoul Wallenberg – (Hon. citizen)
 Eugene Wigner – Nobel Prize in Physics (1963), Enrico Fermi Award (1958), Budapest University of Technology and Economics

Budapest-born academics, artists, athletes, authors, musicians, politicians, and scientists

Notable people
 

Mordechai Efraim Fischel Sofer-Zussman (1867–1942) Hungarian chief rabbi of Budapest

References

 
Budapest
People